Bryan Kevin Porter Jr. (born May 4, 2000), also known by his initials KPJ, is an American professional basketball player for the Houston Rockets of the National Basketball Association (NBA). He played high school basketball for Rainier Beach High School and led the Vikings to the state playoffs in each of his four years. He played college basketball for the USC Trojans.

Early life
Porter was born in Seattle, Washington, to Ayanna and Bryan Kevin Porter Sr. His father played football, basketball, and baseball at Rainier Beach High School in Seattle in the 1990s. In July 2004, when Porter was four years old, his father was shot five times and killed while trying to help someone being attacked. As a result, he was raised by his mother, who became his role model.

High school career
Porter convinced his mother to enroll him at Rainier Beach High School instead of O'Dea High School in Seattle, because his father had played sports there and he wanted to preserve the tradition. In his senior campaign, he averaged 27 points, 14 rebounds, and five assists, as Rainier Beach finished with a 22–7 record. On March 3, 2018, Porter recorded 22 points and 11 rebounds in a Class 3A state championship game loss to Garfield High School. At the end of the season, he was named Washington Mr. Basketball by the state coaches association.

Recruiting
Porter was considered a five-star recruit by recruiting services 247Sports and Rivals and a four-star recruit by ESPN. He was the top-ranked player from Washington in the 2018 class and received offers from several NCAA Division I programs, including UCLA, Oregon, and Washington, before committing to USC. Porter became the first USC player since DeMar DeRozan in 2008 to be rated a five-star recruit by Rivals.

College career
Porter debuted for USC on November 6, 2018, scoring 15 points off the bench on 6-of-7 shooting in an 83–62 win over Robert Morris. On November 20, against Missouri State, he suffered a quadriceps contusion. He returned on December 1 versus Nevada but left after four minutes because he was hindered by the injury. He missed nine games with a quad contusion, and returned again on January 10, 2019, scoring five points in 25 minutes. Three days later, however, he was suspended indefinitely by USC for "personal conduct issues". Regardless, Porter stated that he would finish the season with the team and then played in the last three games of the season. He averaged 9.8 points, four rebounds, and 1.4 assists in 22 minutes a game, playing in 21 of USC's 33 games.

At the conclusion of his freshman season, Porter announced his intention to forgo his remaining collegiate eligibility and declare for the 2019 NBA draft.

Professional career

Cleveland Cavaliers (2019–2021)

In the 2019 NBA draft, Porter was selected 30th overall by the Milwaukee Bucks but was later traded to the Cleveland Cavaliers via the Detroit Pistons. On July 3, 2019, the Cleveland Cavaliers announced that they had signed Porter. On October 23, Porter made his debut in the NBA, playing in a 85–94 loss to the Orlando Magic and finishing with one rebound, two assists, and a steal. On November 4, Porter was suspended for one game without pay for improperly making contact with a game official. His first NBA start for the Cavaliers would come on November 19 against the New York Knicks in a 123–105 loss where he recorded a then career-high 18 points in 31 minutes.

Porter started the 2020–21 season inactive due to his off-season weapons charge, which was later dropped. On January 18, 2021, the Cavaliers announced that Porter would either be traded or released following an outburst regarding a locker change following the Cavaliers' acquisition of Taurean Prince from the Brooklyn Nets. He was ultimately traded to the Rockets three days later having not played a single game with the Cavaliers in the 2020–21 season.

Houston Rockets (2021–present)
On January 21, 2021, Porter was traded to the Houston Rockets for a future top-55 protected second round pick. He was later assigned to the Rockets' G League affiliate, the Rio Grande Valley Vipers, debuting for the Vipers in their season opener on February 10, 2021. On February 25, he recorded the first triple-double of the G League season, scoring 27 points, collecting 11 rebounds and dishing out 14 assists.  On March 6, the rockets officially recalled Porter from the Vipers after an astonish performance in the G-League.  Porter made his official debut with the Rockets on March 11, 2021, suppling with 13 points, ten assists and five rebounds in a game lost against the Sacramento Kings. On April 28, Porter was fined $50,000 for violating the league’s Health and Safety Protocols. In the next following day after the incident, he scored 50 points and recorded 11 assists in a win against the Milwaukee Bucks, becoming the youngest player in NBA history to have 50+ points and 10+ assists in a game. In the end of the regular season, Porter only played 26 games with the Rockets this season despite with many conflict he was dealing, averaging 16.6 point per games, collecting 4.4 percent of rebounds, 6.3 assists and committing 3.1 turnovers.

On January 1, 2022, during a 111–124 loss to the Denver Nuggets, Porter and teammate Christian Wood got into a verbal altercation with Rockets assistant coach John Lucas at halftime. Porter then threw an object into the locker room and left the Toyota Center, the arena where the Rockets were playing, before the game ended. On January 3, Rockets head coach Stephen Silas stated that he had suspended both Porter and Wood for one game each for their behavior. On March 31, 2022, he recorded his first triple double with 30 points, 12 rebounds and 12 assists in a 121-118 loss against Sacramento.

On October 17, 2022, Porter agreed on a four-year, $82.5 million contract extension with the Rockets.

Player profile 

Standing at 6 feet and 4 inches (1.93 meters) with a 6 ft. and 9 in. wingspan (2.05 m), Porter plays both the point guard and shooting guard positions. On offense, he possesses a strong isolation game that is complemented by a high level of athleticism that allows him to be an effective scorer on the perimeter; at and above the rim; and in transition. His elite handling skills allow him to create space and defer to either a step-back jumper, a pull-up shot out of a crossover, or a behind-the-back dribble pull-back. Scouts have pointed out his defense and rebounding abilities as another strength, forcing turnovers and running the ball down the court.

At the time of the draft, he was compared to DeShawn Stevenson, Nick Young, JR Smith, James Harden, C.J. Miles, and Kelly Oubre, Jr. Since the start of the 2018–19 season, Porter was projected as a first-round prospect for the 2019 NBA draft. He looks up to James Harden, a fellow left-handed guard, citing him as one of the biggest influences on his game.

Analysts identified his shot selection, assist-to-turnover ratio, and foul-shooting as a point of improvement in his game in addition to other miscellaneous off-the-court concerns.

Personal life

Weapons charge
On November 15, 2020, Porter Jr. was charged by Mahoning County police following a single car accident for improper handling of a firearm in a vehicle. In a statement the Cleveland Cavaliers stated, "We are aware of the situation involving Kevin Porter Jr. and are in the process of gathering information. We have spoken with Kevin and will continue to address this privately with him as the related process evolves."

A grand jury in Mahoning County declined to indict Porter on the felony gun charge. Misdemeanor charges of driving without a license were also dropped.

Consor apology
In January 2022, Washington Wizards announcer Glenn Consor apologized to Porter Jr., after Consor commented that Porter Jr., "like his dad, pulled the trigger right at the right time." Consor said this after Porter Jr. made a key shot in a Wizards-Rockets game, under the mistaken belief that Porter Jr. was the son of Kevin Porter, a former Washington point guard who retired in 1983. The father of Kevin Porter Jr., Bryan Kevin Porter Sr., pleaded guilty to first-degree manslaughter, served a prison sentence, and later died in a shooting when Porter Jr. was four years old. Porter Jr. is not related to Kevin Porter.

Career statistics

NBA

Regular season

|-
| style="text-align:left;"| 
| style="text-align:left;"| Cleveland
| 50 || 3 || 23.2 || .442 || .335 || .723 || 3.2 || 2.2 || .9 || .3 || 10.0
|-
| style="text-align:left;"| 
| style="text-align:left;"| Houston
| 26 || 23 || 32.1 || .400 || .368 || .734 || 3.8 || 6.3 || .7 || .3 || 16.6
|-
| style="text-align:left;"| 
| style="text-align:left;"| Houston
| 61 || 61 || 31.3 || .415 || .375 || .642 || 4.4 || 6.2 || 1.1 || .3 || 15.6
|- class="sortbottom"
| style="text-align:center;" colspan="2"| Career
| 137 || 87 || 28.5 || .424 || .352 || .686 || 3.9 || 4.7 || 1.0 || .3 || 13.7

College

|-
| style="text-align:left;"| 2018–19
| style="text-align:left;"| USC
|| 21 || 4 || 22.1 || .471 || .412 || .522 || 4.0 || 1.4 || .8 || .5 || 9.5

References

External links

USC Trojans bio

2000 births
Living people
African-American basketball players
American men's basketball players
Basketball players from Seattle
Cleveland Cavaliers players
Houston Rockets players
Milwaukee Bucks draft picks
Rio Grande Valley Vipers players
Shooting guards
USC Trojans men's basketball players
Small forwards
21st-century African-American sportspeople
20th-century African-American sportspeople